Peggy may refer to:

People 
 Peggy (given name), people with the given name or nickname

Arts and entertainment 
 Peggy (musical), a 1911 musical comedy by Stuart and Bovill
 Peggy (album), a 1977 Peggy Lee album
 Peggy (1916 film), a silent comedy
 Peggy (1950 film), a comedy
 Peggy (novel), a 1970 historical novel by Lois Duncan
 the peggies, a Japanese all-female band
 JPEGMAFIA, an American rapper, singer, and record producer
 "Peggy", a song by Dala from Best Day, 2012

Nautical vessels 
 , a United States Navy patrol boat in commission from 1917 to 1918
 Peggy (1793 ship)
 Peggy, a French ship in the 1801 United States Supreme Court case United States v. Schooner Peggy
 Peggy of Castletown, an armed yacht built in 1789, the oldest surviving boat from the Isle of Man

Other uses 
 Mitsubishi Ki-67, a Japanese Second World War heavy bomber given the Allied code name "Peggy"
 Typhoon Peggy
 Tropical Storm Peggy (1945)
 Peggy, Texas, an unincorporated community
 Peggy Creek, South Dakota
 Peggy (Discover Card), an advertising character

See also
 
 
 Peg (disambiguation) 
 Pegi (disambiguation)
 Piggy (disambiguation)